Far Away Lands is an album by jazz saxophonist Hank Mobley recorded on May 26, 1967, but not released on the Blue Note label until 1984. It features performances by Mobley with trumpeter Donald Byrd, pianist Cedar Walton, bassist Ron Carter, and drummer Billy Higgins.

Reception
The Allmusic review by Scott Yanow awarded the album 4 stars, stating: "For this lesser-known outing, Mobley teams up with trumpeter Donald Byrd, pianist Cedar Walton, bassist Ron Carter, and drummer Billy Higgins for four of his songs (given such colorful titles as 'A Dab of This and That,' 'No Argument,' 'The Hippity Hop,' and 'Bossa for Baby'), along with a song apiece from Byrd and Jimmy Heath. An excellent outing, fairly late in the productive career of Hank Mobley.

Track listing 
All compositions by Hank Mobley except where noted.

 "A Dab of This and That" - 5:10
 "Far Away Lands" (Heath) - 5:36
 "No Argument" - 6:33
 "The Hippity Hop" - 5:41
 "Bossa for Baby" - 6:08
 "Soul Time" (Byrd) - 6:47

Personnel 
 Hank Mobley — tenor saxophone
 Donald Byrd — trumpet
 Cedar Walton — piano
 Ron Carter — bass
 Billy Higgins — drums

References 

1984 albums
Albums produced by Alfred Lion
Blue Note Records albums
Hank Mobley albums
Albums recorded at Van Gelder Studio